Marsha Steinberg (born 1946, Los Angeles, California, United States) is a Florentine artist, whose works include drawings, etchings and paintings. She is Coordinator of the Studio Art Program at the California State University Program, Florence and is professor of painting at the Italian International Institute, Lorenzo de' Medici in Florence, Italy.

Education and training
In 1974, Steinberg moved to Florence, Italy, to further her training and education.  She received her degree in painting from the Accademia di 
Belle Arti di Firenze while enrolled at the California State University International Program where she received her Master's in Art.  In addition, she completed a specialization in etching at Il Bisonte, International School of Advanced Printmaking in Florence where she later worked as assistant.

Years in the Maremma
In the 1970s, she began a period of study and research in the untamed region in Southern Tuscany, known as the Maremma, that was to last for nearly ten years.  This is where she produced works in various media that reflect her personal relationship with nature and where Greek mythology plays an important role featured in the recurring presence of bulls in her subject 
matter.

Recent works
Her most recent series of paintings is called Cattivi Maestri e Donna/Iniquitous Masters and Woman, in which the artist represents herself in front of paint-ings by her heroes, the Abstract Expressionists, Rothko, Gorky, and De Koon-ing.

Galleries
She is represented in New York City by Danette Koke Fine Art and in Florence by Linea Spazio Arte Contemporanea Gallery

Publications
The following publications feature Marsha Steinberg:
“An Interview with Marsha Steinberg” Danielsen, Marissa, FLO’N THE GO, Florence, 2012.
California State University Summer Arts, Florence, 2012.
“Artist Profile: Marsha Steinberg”, Lamas, Lilia, blog publication, Florence, 2009.
“Creazione dal nulla & Icaro e il labirinto di via Fani” Marsha Steinberg e Swietlan Kraczyna, 2005, presentatione di Rolando Bellini, Consiglio Regionale della Toscana, Palazzo Panciatichi, Firenze
“Arte, doppia mostra e Palazzo Panciatichi, 2-2-05, Il Parlamento della Toscana, Firenze
“Le creazioni dal nulla e il gioco del labirinto”, 6-2-05, LA STAMPA,  Cultura e Spettocoli, di Fiorella Minervino
“I disegni esposti a Palazzo Panciatichi”, 4-2-05, Corriere di Firenze, di Chiara Bini
Giornata di Studio “Vecchi e Nuovi Sintomi nella Cura Analitica”, 1998, Scuola Europea di Psicoanalisi, Sezione Italiana, Palazzo degli Affari, Firenze : incisione originale, grafica design - programma
"Marsha Steinberg e Sylvia B. Teri", 1996, presentazione di Rolando Bellini e Paola Bortolotti, Palazzo Comunale, Empoli,: catalogo
Il Segno di Empoli, Empoli, Rivista Trimestrale dell'Associazione Turistica Pro Empoli, Anno 8 - N. 34, Giugno 1996, "Due artiste americane"
"Dipinti e Acqueforti", 1993, presentazione di Rolando Bellini, Comune di Prato, Prato,: depliant
"Monotipi Americani", 1993, presentazione di Rolando Bellini, Provincia di Firenze, Firenze: catalogo
"Quattrocento", 1992, presentazione di Rolando Bellini, Galleria Davanzati, Firenze: monotipo originale
"Paesaggi", 1992, presentazione di Rolando Bellini, Galleria Davanzati, Firenze: incisone originale
"Eros e Psyche", 1992, presentazione di Rolando Bellini, Galleria Davanzati, Firenze: incisione originale
"Storie", 1991, presentazione di Rolando Bellini, Provincia di Firenze, Firenze: catalogo
"Ritratto di Jacques Lacan", 1991, Campo Freudiano, Istituto Freudiano per la Clinica, la Terapia e la Scienza, Roma,: incisione originale
"Omaggio alla Psicoanalisi", 1991, Campo Freudiano, Istituto Freudiano per la Clinica, la Terapia e la Scienza, Roma,: incisione originale
Techniche 3, Milano, Ed. Riza, Anno 2, Numero 1, Marzo 1990, "Opere di MarshaSteinberg"
"Eros e Psyche", 1989, presentazione di Renzo Federici: cartella di otto inci-sioni originali 
"Dipinti e Acqueforti", 1989, Azienda Autonoma di Turismo, presentazione di Renzo Federici, Firenze: catalogo
Marsha Steinberg : dipinti e acqueforti : Firenze, Logia Rucellai. - Firenze : Fondazione sigma-tau, [1980?]. - 13 p.: ill. color. 24 cm 
Classificazione: 759.5  [21] Biblioteca delle Oblate: Misc. 481 13
Marsha Steinberg: dipinti e acqueforti : Firenze, Loggia Rucellai. - [S. l. : s. n., 199-] (Firenze : Pochini). - 13 p.: ill.; 24 cm Classificazione: 759.13 [21] 10904017 Firenze [AC686] Biblioteca del Consiglio - Biblioteca dell'Identità Tosca-na:BIT9.511FIR75MAR Kantzas, P. Ritorno a Freud, Pisa, ETS Editrice, 1988: incisione originale di Marsha Steinberg -"Freud a Londra".
Firenze 1986 Capitale Europea della Cultura: Itinerari della Psiche. Le Passioni dell'Anima in Europa");  Cinque Seminari Altamente Specializzati" CE.R.ME. Centro di Ricerca Mentale, Palazzo Medici Riccardi, Firenze: disegno originale in china  "Eros andPsyche", grafica design - poster, invito, programma e block notes.

Selected Permanent collections in museums
Marsha Steinberg's work is part of the following permanent collections:

The New Primitives Collection, The Museum of Peace, dedicated to Galileo Galilei, Vico Nel Lazio,
Museum of Contemporary Art, Florina, Greece
Gallery of Modern Art, the Municipality of Empoli,  Empoli

Selection of private collections
Her artwork is part of the following private collections:
Ristorante Dino, Fiesole, Italy
Baroness Charlotte Ricasoli, Florence, Italy
Time Warner, New York, USA
Atria Senior Living Group, Manhattan, New York, USA 
Price Waterhouse, New York, USA
Delta Airlines, VIP First Class, Kennedy Airport, New York, USA
British Airways, VIP First Class, Atlanta Airport, Giorgia, USA
Salvo Andò, Ministry of Defense, Italy
Francine Ellman Gallery, Santa Monica, Calif., USA
Prime Minister Bettino Craxi, Italy
Pres. Sigma - tau, Rome, Italy
Prof. Panaiotis Kantzas, Fiesole, Italy
Restaurant Mezzaluna, London, England
California State University International Program, Florence, Italy
Ristorante la Giunca, Poggio a Caiano, Prato, Italy
Nance Bornn, Los, Angeles, California, USA
Deana Izen Miller Gallery, Santa Monica, California, USA
Danette Koke Fine Art, New York, USA
California State University International Programs, Long Beach, Calif., USA
Ambassador, Marisa Lino, Arlington, Washington, D.C., USA
Anna Chimenti Sorgi, Rome, Italy 
Gen. Leonardo Tricarico, General Aeronautics District, Rome, Italy
Michael Mitchell, Los Angeles, California, USA
Scuola Europea di Psicoanalisi, Sezione Italiana, Roma, Italy

References

1946 births
Living people
People from Los Angeles
20th-century American painters
21st-century American painters
California State University alumni
American women painters
20th-century American women artists
21st-century American women artists